Frances Robinson (born Marion Frances Ladd; April 26, 1916 – August 16, 1971) was an American actress.

Early life
Robinson was born Marion Frances Ladd in the Fort Wadsworth section of Staten Island, New York, on April 26, 1916. Her father was U. S. Army Major James A. Ladd.

At age 5, Robinson portrayed Little Henrietta in the silent film Orphans of the Storm (1921). Before acting in films as an adult, she was a model for the agency operated by John Robert Powers.

Career
Her acting roles included a nurse in The Invisible Man Returns (1940) and Marcia in the 1941 version of Dr Jekyll and Mr Hyde. On television, she portrayed Louise Stewart in 1957 as a member of the regular cast of the CBS situation comedy Mr. Adams and Eve during its first season.

Personal life
Robinson was married to Sonny Chalif, a nephew of actress Mary Pickford; and they had a son, Louis.

She died on August 16, 1971, in Los Angeles, California, at the age of 55 of an apparent heart attack.

Partial filmography

 Tim Tyler's Luck (1937, Serial)
 Forbidden Valley (1938)
 His Exciting Night (1938)
 Personal Secretary (1938)
 The Last Warning (1938)
 Desperate Trails (1939) 
 So You Won't Talk (1940)
 The Lone Wolf Keeps a Date (1940)
 Glamour for Sale (1940)
 Outlaws of the Panhandle (1941)
 Dr Jekyll and Mr Hyde (1941) as Marcia
 Bedtime Story (1964)

References

External links

 

1916 births
1971 deaths
American film actresses
20th-century American actresses
People from Staten Island
Actresses from New York City
American child actresses
American silent film actresses